XHSI-FM is a radio station on 92.1 FM in Santiago Ixcuintla, Nayarit, Mexico. The station is known as Radio Positiva.

History
XHSI began as XESI-AM 1240, awarded to Julio Mondragón González on April 14, 1954. The station did not take to air until May 5, 1957.

In 2011, XESI migrated to FM as XHSI-FM. Despite being on 94.5 until January 2014, the station was given the 92.1 frequency at the start of migration.

The station moved to 94.5 MHz on November 14, 2022. The Federal Telecommunications Institute approved the frequency change to reduce interference to XHUX-FM in Tepic.

References

Radio stations in Nayarit